L'école secondaire Félix-Leclerc is a French speaking secondary school located in Pointe-Claire, Quebec, Canada. It is named after the Canadian singer Félix Leclerc. The school provides secondary education, starting from secondary 1 to 5 (grade 7-11). The school also offers a special International program called Excellence.

References 

Education in Pointe-Claire
High schools in Quebec